The XV Venice Challenge Save Cup was a professional tennis tournament played on clay courts. It was the 4th edition of the men's tournament which was part of the 2017 ATP Challenger Tour. It took place in Mestre, Italy between 22 and 28 May 2017.

Point distribution

Singles main-draw entrants

Seeds

1 Rankings as of May 15, 2017.

Other entrants
The following players received wildcards into the singles main draw:
  Liam Caruana
  Julian Ocleppo
  Andrea Pellegrino
  Matteo Viola

The following players received entry from the qualifying draw:
  Gianluca Mager
  Gianluigi Quinzi
  Adrian Ungur
  Jürgen Zopp

Champions

Singles

 João Domingues def.  Sebastian Ofner 7–6(7–4), 6–4.

Doubles

 Ken Skupski /  Neal Skupski def.  Julian Knowle /  Igor Zelenay 5–7, 6–4, [10–5].

References

Venice Challenge Save Cup
Venice Challenge Save Cup
May 2017 sports events in Italy
2017 in Italian sport